Oedipina alfaroi is a species of salamander in the family Plethodontidae. It is found in the Caribbean versant of eastern Costa Rica (Limón Province) and northwestern Panama (Bocas del Toro Province). It is commonly known as the Limon worm salamander.

Etymology
The specific name alfaroi honors Anastasio Alfaro from the Museo Nacional de Costa Rica.

Description
The head is pointed and the eyes are relatively small. Maxillary teeth are absent. Body is dark or purplish brown above and grayish below.

Habitat and conservation
It lives in the leaf litter. This uncommon species is threatened by habitat loss as it does not tolerate opening up of its forest habitat. It occurs in the Palo Seco Forest Reserve (Panama).

References

alfaroi
Amphibians of Costa Rica
Amphibians of Panama
Taxa named by Emmett Reid Dunn
Amphibians described in 1921
Taxonomy articles created by Polbot